Barry David Lloyd (born 19 February 1949) is an English retired professional footballer and manager. As a player, he most notably played as a midfielder in the Football League for Fulham, for whom he was captain and made over 280 appearances for the club. He also played league football for Brentford, Hereford United and Chelsea. After his retirement as a player, Lloyd managed Brighton & Hove Albion and non-League clubs Worthing and Yeovil Town.

Playing career 
A midfielder, Lloyd began his senior career at First Division club Chelsea. He failed to break into the first team before joining Fulham in December 1968, in a player-exchange deal which saw John Dempsey move to Chelsea for a £70,000 fee. Lloyd made 286 appearances and scored 30 goals during  seasons at Craven Cottage and captained the club to promotion from the Third Division in the 1970–71 season. He was an unused substitute during the 2–0 1975 FA Cup Final defeat to West Ham United. Lloyd wound down his career with spells at Hereford United, Brentford and Houston Hurricane, before retiring in 1978.

Management career

Yeovil Town 
Lloyd began his management career at Southern League Premier Division club Yeovil Town in August 1978. During the 1978–79 season, he oversaw a mid-table finish and won the Somerset Premier Cup. The Glovers were transferred to the new Alliance Premier League for the 1979–80 season and with the club's league form mixed, he was sacked in January 1981.

Worthing 
Lloyd joined Isthmian League Second Division club Worthing in 1981 and won a double-promotion in his first two seasons in charge, with top-spot finishes in the Second and First Divisions respectively elevating the club to the Premier Division for the 1983–84 season. The team finished runners-up in 1983–84 and 1984–85, but failed to achieve promotion to the Alliance Premier League before Lloyd's departure at the end of the 1985–86 season.

Brighton & Hove Albion 
Lloyd returned to the Football League when he joined Second Division club Brighton & Hove Albion as assistant to manager Alan Mullery in 1986. After Mullery was sacked in January 1987, Lloyd was promoted into the role, but he could not prevent Brighton's relegation to the Third Division at the end of the 1986–87 season. In his first full season as manager, Lloyd won immediate promotion back to the Second Division with a runners-up finish, largely thanks to 32-goal forward Garry Nelson. Two successful battles against relegation followed, before Lloyd guided the club to the 1991 Second Division play-off Final, which was lost 3–1 to Notts County. One year later, Albion suffered relegation back to the third-tier and the club was in a financial crisis after years of over-spending. A 9th-place finish followed at the end of the 1992–93 season and Lloyd resigned in December 1993.

Return to Worthing 
Lloyd rejoined Worthing, then in the Isthmian League First Division, as caretaker manager in November 2001 and he was appointed to the role full-time in December. He achieved two mid-tables finishes before being sacked in July 2003.

Other roles 
Lloyd began taking his coaching badges while a 17-year-old at Chelsea. From 1993 to 2001 and 2001 to 2007 he worked for various clubs in differing roles, before returning to Brighton & Hove Albion as chief scout in September 2007.

Career statistics

Honours

As a player 
Fulham
 Football League Third Division second-place promotion: 1970–71
Brentford
 Football League Fourth Division fourth-place promotion: 1977–78

As a manager 
Brighton & Hove Albion
 Football League Third Division second-place promotion: 1987–88
Worthing
 Isthmian League First Division: 1982–83
 Isthmian League Second Division: 1981–82
Yeovil Town
 Somerset Premier Cup: 1978–79

References

External links 
 

1949 births
Living people
Brentford F.C. players
Brighton & Hove Albion F.C. managers
Chelsea F.C. players
English footballers
English football managers
Fulham F.C. players
Hereford United F.C. players
Footballers from Uxbridge
Yeovil Town F.C. managers
English Football League players
Association football midfielders
English Football League managers
North American Soccer League (1968–1984) players
Houston Hurricane players
Expatriate soccer players in the United States
English expatriate sportspeople in the United States
Isthmian League managers
National League (English football) managers
Sunderland A.F.C. non-playing staff
English expatriate footballers
Southern Football League managers